A is a 1998 Japanese documentary film about the Aum Shinrikyo cult following the arrest of its leaders for instigating the sarin gas attack on the Tokyo subway in 1995. The film focuses on a young spokesman for the cult Hiroshi Araki, a troubled 28-year-old who had severed all family ties and rejected all forms of materialism before joining the sect.

Director Tatsuya Mori was allowed exclusive access to Aum's offices for over a year as news media were continually kept out. However, despite the documentary's unique perspective on Aum's internal workings, it was not financially successful.

Mori released the sequel A2 in 2001, which followed the dissolution of the cult in the absence of their leader, Shoko Asahara.

Cast
Hiroshi Araki - Himself

References

External links

"A" review at Midnight Eye

1998 films
Japanese documentary films
1998 documentary films
Aum Shinrikyo
Documentary films about terrorism
1990s Japanese films